Lawrence Graham-Brown  is a Jamaican-American artist and performer based in New York. His work confronts religion, sexuality, and blackness in Sacred Spaces. He is openly gay and his works combat homophobia across geographical contexts. His work has been presented at the Queens Museum, El Museo del Barrio, Leslie-Lohman Museum ofArt, National Gallery of Jamaica and  the Shanghai Bienniale.

References 

Living people
Year of birth missing (living people)
American artists